Living in the 70's is the debut album by Melbourne band Skyhooks. Released in October 1974 on the Mushroom Records label, the album achieved relatively little success until early 1975. It spent 16 weeks at the top of the Australian album charts from late February 1975, and became the highest-selling album by an Australian act in Australia until that time, with sales of over 200,000. In October 2010, it was listed at No. 9 in the book 100 Best Australian Albums. The album's eponymous track was ranked number 72 as part of Triple M's "Ozzest 100", the 'most Australian' songs of all time ranking.

Details
The album was produced by former Daddy Cool lead singer Ross Wilson.

The artwork (external front and back, and internal gatefold) was painted by Niels Hutchison.

Two singles were lifted from the album: "Livin' in the 70's", which was released with a non-LP track, "You're a Broken Gin Bottle, Baby", included as track 11 on the 2004 CD remaster; and "Horror Movie"/"Carlton (Lygon Street Limbo)". The latter spent 2 weeks at the top of the Australian singles chart in 1975. Six tracks from the album were banned on commercial radio in Australia; in defiance of this, however, the ABC's new youth station in Sydney, 2JJ, played the track "You Just Like Me 'Cos I'm Good in Bed" as its first ever song when it began broadcasting in January 1975.

In 2011 the album featured at number 75 on the Triple J Hottest 100 Albums of All Time. In the same year, the album was added to the National Film and Sound Archive of Australia's Sounds of Australia registry.

Track listing

Personnel
Shirley Strachan – lead vocals (all but 8)
Red Symons – guitar, backing and lead (8) vocals, mandolin
Bob "Bongo" Starkie – guitar, backing vocals
Greg Macainsh – bass guitar, backing vocals
Imants Alfred "Freddie" Strauks – drums, backing vocals, percussion

Charts

Weekly charts

Year-end charts

Sales

References

1974 debut albums
Skyhooks (band) albums
Mushroom Records albums